Stygodiaptomus kieferi is a species of crustacean in the family Diaptomidae. It is endemic to Bosnia and Herzegovina.

See also
Stygodiaptomus petkovskii

References

Diaptomidae
Freshwater crustaceans of Europe
Endemic fauna of Bosnia and Herzegovina
Taxonomy articles created by Polbot
Crustaceans described in 1981